Digrammia pallorata is a species of moth in the family Geometridae (geometrid moths). It was described by Douglas C. Ferguson in 2008 and is found in North America, where it has been recorded from Utah, Colorado, Nevada, Texas, New Mexico, Arizona and California.

The length of the forewings is 11–14 mm for males and 14–16 mm for females.

The larvae feed on Juniperus monosperma and Juniperus pinhotii.

The MONA or Hodges number for Digrammia pallorata is 6363.1.

References

Further reading
 Ferguson, Douglas C.; Hodges, R. W.; et al., eds. (2008). "Geometroidea: Geometridae (part), Ennominae (Part - Abraxini, Cassymini, Macariini)". The Moths of North America North of Mexico, fasc. 17.2, 430.
 Arnett, Ross H. (2000). American Insects: A Handbook of the Insects of America North of Mexico. CRC Press.

External links
Butterflies and Moths of North America

Macariini
Moths described in 2008